Leon Ware is the self-titled debut studio album by American musician Leon Ware. It was released in 1972 and was his only release for United Artists Records.

Background 
In 1971, Ware collaborated with Ike & Tina Turner, co-writing several songs on their album, 'Nuff Said. The moderate success of 'Nuff Said led the Turners' record label at the time, United Artists, to hand Ware a recording contract as a solo artist.

Reception 

Although the album failed to chart, the album did receive positive reviews from critics. Bob Talbert of the Detroit Free Press wrote, "Detroiter Leon Ware is a marvelous songwriter". He continued, "Ware is also a superb singer..." Omaha World-Herald commended the album, citing that the album was "the strong, individualistic vocal and piano work of Leon Ware". Moreover, they predicted that "[Ware] should be headed for considerable popularity".

Track listing 
Side one

Side two

Personnel 
 Leon Ware – vocals, piano, arrangement, producer
 Doug Gilmore – producer
 Gorden De Witty – piano, organ
 Jeff Brown – organ
 Jackie Clark – guitar, bass
 Ernie McDaniel – bass
 Terry Furlong – guitar
 Jimmy Brown, Stu Perry – drums
 Clydie King, Jesse Smith, Julia Tillman, Maxine Willard, Patrice Holloway – backing vocals
 Christina Hersch, Jerry Burns – recording engineer
 Norman Seeff – art direction, photography
 Dave Bhang – design

References

External links 
 Leon Ware at Discogs (list of releases)

1972 albums
Leon Ware albums
Albums produced by Leon Ware
United Artists Records albums